The Cult are an English hard rock band from Bradford. Formed in April 1983, the group were originally known as SOUTHERN Death Cult, then Death Cult and finally, The Cult. They featured vocalist Ian Astbury, guitarist Billy Duffy, bassist Jamie Stewart and drummer Ray "Mondo" Taylor-Smith. The group's current lineup includes Astbury and Duffy, alongside drummer John Tempesta (since 2006), keyboardist/rhythm guitarist Damon Fox (since 2015) and bassist Charlie Jones (since 2022).

History

1983–1988

Ian Astbury and Billy Duffy formed Death Cult in April 1983, enlisting Ritual rhythm section Jamie Stewart and Ray Mondo to complete the band's initial lineup. After the release of a self-titled debut EP, the group fired Mondo in September and replaced him with Nigel Preston of Sex Gang Children (Mondo took Preston's place in Sex Gang Children). Death Cult issued one more release under their original name, "Gods Zoo", before renaming themselves the Cult in January 1984. The band released their full-length debut Dreamtime in September, early copies of which were packaged with Dreamtime Live at the Lyceum. Another single, "Ressurection Joe", followed at the end of the year. Shortly after the release of "She Sells Sanctuary" in May 1985, Preston was fired from the Cult as he had "become too unreliable".

Mark Brzezicki of Big Country, who had initially substituted for Preston at the filming of the "She Sells Sanctuary" music video after he hadn't shown up, recorded drums for the rest of the 1985 album Love as a session member. During the sessions, Les Warner took over as the band's new permanent drummer. The new lineup recorded a planned third album Peace in late 1986, however the result was scrapped and remained unreleased until it was featured on the 2000 box set Rare Cult. Working with new producer Rick Rubin, the group issued Electric in April 1987. For the album's tour, Stephen "Kid Chaos" Harris from Zodiac Mindwarp and the Love Reaction joined on bass and Stewart switched to guitar. Harris has claimed that he actually contributed to the recording of Electric, having joined the band in January 1987.

1988–1995
After the conclusion of the Electric touring cycle, Harris and Warner were both fired at the beginning of 1988. The group returned to the studio to record several demos, first with Badlands drummer Eric Singer and later with Chris Taylor from producer Bob Rock's group Rock and Hyde, before tracking the final version of Sonic Temple with Mickey Curry of Bryan Adams's band. For the subsequent promotional tour, Matt Sorum was hired on drums after auditioning in addition to Taylor. After the tour ended in April 1990, founding bassist Stewart left the Cult "to concentrate on producing, composing, and spending time with his wife". He was followed in July by Sorum, who was hired to replace Steve Adler in Guns N' Roses. After a brief hiatus, Astbury and Duffy reconvened to record a collection of new demos with bassist Todd Hoffman and drummer James Kottak in early 1991. As with Sonic Temple in 1989, drums on the final version of Ceremony were performed by Mickey Curry, while Keith Richards's bandmate Charley Drayton was brought in to contribute bass.

The Cult returned to touring in October 1991, with Astbury and Duffy joined by bassist Kinley Wolfe and drummer Michael Lee. The tour spawned a live album, Live Cult, which was released in 1993. At the beginning of that year, Wolfe and Lee were replaced by Craig Adams (formerly of the Mission) and Scott Garrett (formerly of Dag Nasty), respectively. Mike Dimkich, formerly of Channel 3, joined the band as touring rhythm guitarist at the same time, before he was replaced by James Stevenson the following year. In between the two tours, the band's core lineup recorded their only album with Adams and Garrett, The Cult, which was released in October 1994. In March 1995, the band cancelled a string of tour dates and broke up, which was attributed primarily to tensions between Astbury and Duffy.

Since 1999

After four years away, Astbury and Duffy reformed the Cult in April 1999 with returning drummer Matt Sorum and new bassist Martyn LeNoble. Mike Dimkich also returned as touring rhythm guitarist. LeNoble left after tour dates ending in the summer of 2000, with Chris Wyse taking his place for the bulk of the recording for 2001's Beyond Good and Evil. In preparation for the album's promotional tour, LeNoble was reported in March 2001 to be returning, however by May this had changed to be Billy Morrison in a touring capacity. In February 2002, it was reported that the band had been dropped by their label Atlantic Records and all but disbanded, which according to Sorum was again due to tensions between Astbury and Duffy. After a short tour with returning members Craig Adams and Scott Garrett, the band officially went on hiatus in October.

Following several months of rumours, a second Cult reunion was announced in January 2006, with bassist Chris Wyse and drummer John Tempesta (formerly of Exodus, Testament and more) added to the band's lineup the next month. This lineup remained stable for several years, releasing Born into This in 2007, two singles in 2010, and Choice of Weapon in 2012. In July 2013, touring guitarist Dimkich left to join Bad Religion, with James Stevenson taking his place again. By early 2015, both Stevenson and Wyse had left, with Chris Chaney contributing the majority of bass recordings on the group's 2016 album Hidden City. After the album was finished, the band returned to touring with new members Grant Fitzpatrick on bass and Damon Fox on keyboards and rhythm guitar.

Members

Current

Former

Backup

Timeline

Lineups

References

External links
The Cult official website

Cult, The